"Miorița" (ad. mioriță, lit. 'The Little Ewe Lamb'), also transliterated as "Mioritza", is an old Romanian pastoral ballad  considered to be one of the most important pieces of Romanian folklore. It has numerous versions with quite different content, but the literary version by poet Vasile Alecsandri (1850) is the best known and praised. This had erstwhile been the oldest known written text, arousing suspicion that the poet may have authored it entirely, until the discovery was made of a version from the 1790s.

Etymology 
The Romanian word mioriță, with diminutive suffix -ița, is the diminutive form of  meaning 'ewe lamb', therefore, the literal meaning is "little ewe lamb". Some have translated the title as "The Lambkin".

Summary 
A summary adhering to the plotline of Alecsandri's poem is as follows:

Three shepherds, one a Moldovan, another a Transylvanian and the third a Wallachian/Vrancean, meet while tending their flocks of sheep.

In the Moldovan's flock, there is a black-fleeced (or black-spotted) and black-muzzled animal (or perhaps flecked with gray). It is an enchanted ewe lamb which can talk, and it informs its master that the other two are plotting to murder him so they can steal his livestock (sheep, horses, hounds). The shepherd is resigned to the fate of his own death, and instructs the lamb that in the event of his murder, the lamb is to go ask his killers to bury his body by the sheepfold (sheep's pen). The ewe was also to tell all his other sheep that he has married a princess during a wedding attended by the elements of nature, marked by a falling star, this cosmic event with nuptial elements represents the Moldovan shepherd's vision of death.

The shepherd also requests that his three instruments—a little flute or shepherd's pipe made of beech, another flute-pipe made bone, and a third flute-pipe made of —be buried beside his head, so that whenever the wind blew, the flutes would play and the sheep would gather.

The poem concludes with shepherd's instruction for the ewe to act as messenger to his aging mother: she is to be told the same story, that he has gone off to marry a princess at heaven's gate (or marry the Black Earth in some versions). According to the shepherd's earlier instructions (to give to the other sheep), what will become of him is that The Hills will officiate as the priest, and the Sun and Moon act as his godparents—in other words, he is describing his own imminent death in veiled terms, completely allegorized as a Romanian wedding.

Textual sources 
The pastoral ballad has been passed down in a widespread area across the Romanian provinces, with Moldavia at the core. There have been over one thousand versions collected, the best-known and lauded is the reworking by Vasile Alecsandri published in the winter of 1850, perhaps collected straight off of street minstrels.
The claim that Alecu Russo was the ballad's discoverer who supplied the material to the poet has been subject to skepticism, since nothing has been found among Russo's papers to substantiate it.

A version predating Alecsandri's by several decades came to light in 1991, inscribed in the journals of Gheorghe Șincai from the first half of the 1790s. The Alecsandri version is not entirely different from this, thus establishing that there were indeed original base texts available to him at the time to be reworked, rather than him having to reconstruct the ballad out of whole cloth.

It has also been asserted that the ballad originates from the Vrancea district, but the role of the murderous Vrancean shepherd is replaced by a Jewish shepherd in known Vrancean variants of the ballad. The ballad occurs in every Romanian province (thus also in Oltenia and Ukrainian Bessarabia),, and the names (nationalities) of the shepherds and geographical details depends on the localization. The Transylvanian version lacks the lamb's clairvoyance but retains the last will concerning the objects to bury and cosmic wedding.

Translations 
A prose translation in English, "Miora", appeared in E. C. Grenville Murray's Doĭne: Or, the National Songs and Legends of Roumania (1853). This was followed by Lord Henry Stanley's verse translations (1856) into English as well as French.

A translation by N. W. Newcombe was also printed in Grigore Nandriș's Colloquial Romanian (1945). The ballad was also rendered under the title "Mioritza: The Canticle of the Sheep, the Enchanted Ewe" by Octavian Buhociu (The Pastoral Paradise: Romanian Folklore, 1966). Translations by Pulitzer Prize-winning poet William D. Snodgrass appeared in Miorița (1972), Cinci Balade Populare. Five Folk Ballads (c. 1993) and Selected Translations ("The Ewe Lamb", 1998). A translation by Ernest H. Latham Jr. was published in a Doca's grammar book in 1995; Latham's version (with Kiki Skagen Munshi as co-translator) appeared in his 2020 monograph on the poem.

Analysis 

Miorița was identified as one of the four cornerstone myths used as theme in Romaniank folk poetry, according to the analysis of George Călinescu (1941).

Although the poem may be seen as an exemplar traditional Christianity, i.e., turning the other cheek, Mircea Eliade sees "cosmic Christianity" at work, i.e., "the capacity to annul the apparently irremediable consequences of a tragic event by charging them with previously unsuspected values". Man's bond with Nature is emphasized: this "mystical solidarity" is what enables the shepherd to overcome his fate. This bond with Nature is also spoken in terms of the "cosmic marriage" or "mioritic marriage".

Legacy 
The Miorița ballad is summarized and discussed by Mircea Eliade in Zalmoxis, The Vanishing God (1972), and plays a fundamental role in his novel The Forbidden Forest.

The poem was quoted extensively by Patrick Leigh Fermor in his account of the second part of a journey on foot from Holland to Constantinople in 1933–34. He includes a partial translation of the poem which he refers to as "ramshackle but pretty accurate", which was completed during an extended stay in Eastern Romania before September 1939.

The Miorița is often referred to in Marcus Sedgwick's novel My Swordhand is Singing (2006).

Explanatory notes

References
Citations

Bibliography

(Translations)
 Newcombe, N. W., tr. "Miorița", pp. 272−277 in: 
 Latham, Ernest H., Jr., tr. "Miorița— the most quintessentially Romanian ballad" in: 
 —— tr., in: 
 Margul-Sperber, Alfred (1967) "Miorița ("Little Ewe-Lamb")". Romanian Review 21, pp. 66–68
 
 

(Studies)
 
 ; Reprint (2021)

External links

Miorița - in English (translation by W. D. Snodgrass)
Mioriţa - a vocal version, sung by Grigore Leșe (An .asf file)

Romanian folk poetry
Romanian mythology
Fictional Romanian people